Akshay Dewalkar (born 2 July 1988) is an Indian badminton player. He was the men's doubles National Champion together with Pranav Chopra in 2013 and 2015. Dewalkar was the men's team gold medalists at the 2006 and 2016 South Asian Games, also won a men's doubles silver in 2016 with Chopra and a bronze in 2006 with Jishnu Sanyal. He participated at the 2010, 2014 Asian Games and 2014 Commonwealth Games

Personal life 
Dewalkar announced his engagement with Mridu Sharma, the psychologist appointed by Sports Authority of India at the Gopichand Academy in 2017.

Achievements

South Asian Games 
Men's doubles

BWF Grand Prix (2 runners-up) 
The BWF Grand Prix had two levels, the BWF Grand Prix and Grand Prix Gold. It was a series of badminton tournaments sanctioned by the Badminton World Federation (BWF) which was held from 2007 to 2017.

Men's doubles

  BWF Grand Prix Gold tournament
  BWF Grand Prix tournament

BWF International Challenge/Series (6 titles, 6 runners-up) 
Men's doubles

Mixed doubles

  BWF International Challenge tournament
  BWF International Series tournament
  BWF Future Series tournament

References

External links 
 
 
 

1988 births
Living people
Racket sportspeople from Mumbai
Indian male badminton players
Indian national badminton champions
Badminton players at the 2014 Commonwealth Games
Commonwealth Games competitors for India
Badminton players at the 2010 Asian Games
Badminton players at the 2014 Asian Games
Asian Games competitors for India
South Asian Games gold medalists for India
South Asian Games silver medalists for India
South Asian Games bronze medalists for India
South Asian Games medalists in badminton